Virginie Isabelle Chevalet (born 1 December 1984) in Paris, France, is a synchronized swimmer athlete  who represent Paraguay in this sport.

Her participation at the 2010 South American Games in Medellin has been the historical debut of Paraguay in this sport.

Currently, she lives in Aregua.

References

1984 births
Living people
Swimmers from Paris
French synchronized swimmers
Paraguayan synchronized swimmers
People from Areguá